Thomas Neilson Paulin (born 25 January 1949 in Leeds, England) is a Northern Irish poet and critic of film, music and literature. He lives in England, where he was the G. M. Young Lecturer in English Literature at Hertford College, Oxford.

Early life 
While he was still young, Paulin's Northern Irish Protestant mother and English father moved from Leeds to Belfast and Paulin grew up in a middle class area of the city. According to Paulin, his parents, a doctor and headmaster, held "vaguely socialist liberal views".  While still a teenager, Paulin joined the Trotskyist Socialist Labour League.

Paulin was educated at Annadale Grammar School, Hull University and Lincoln College, Oxford.

Work 
From 1972 to 1994, he worked at the University of Nottingham, first as a lecturer and then as a Reader of Poetry. In 1977, he won the Somerset Maugham prize for his poetry collection A State of Justice and later established his reputation as a literary critic with work such as Minotaur: Poetry and the Nation State (1992). He has championed the work of literary and social critic William Hazlitt and has taken part in a campaign which succeeded in having Hazlitt's gravestone refurbished.

Paulin is considered to be among a group of writers from a Unionist background "who have attempted to recover the radical Protestant republican heritage of the eighteenth century to challenge orthodox concepts" of Northern Irish Protestant identity. His passionate arguments and desire for a political poetry hails from the influence of John Milton, according to critic Jonathan Hufstader, though his outrage "often consumes itself in congested anger".

Paulin is most widely known in Britain for his appearances on the late-night BBC arts programmes The Late Show, Late Review and Newsnight Review.

Following the success of the Field Day Theatre Company's tour of Brian Friel's play Translations in late 1980, the two founding directors (Friel and Stephen Rea) decided to make Field Day a permanent enterprise. Thus, to qualify for financial support from both the Northern Irish and the Irish governments, they expanded the governing board from the original two members to six: Friel, Rea, Paulin, Seamus Deane, Seamus Heaney and David Hammond.

Paulin was a member of the Labour Party but resigned after declaring that the government of Tony Blair was "a Zionist government". His poem "Killed in Crossfire" when published in British newspaper The Observer aroused some controversy for referring to a Palestinian boy being "gunned down by the Zionist SS". According to Denis MacShane in Globalising Hatred: The New Antisemitism (2008), it was Paulin's expression of his "anger and anguish at the behaviour of Israeli troops". In an interview he gave to the state-owned Egyptian newspaper Al-Ahram Weekly, Paulin described Israeli government actions in Palestine as "an historical obscenity". When asked how he responds to accusations of anti-Semitism that follow such descriptions, he told the newspaper "I just laugh when they do that to me. It does not worry me at all. These are the Hampstead liberal Zionists. I have utter contempt for them. They use this card of anti-Semitism". Regarding supporters of Israel, Paulin stated "You are either a Zionist or an anti-Zionist. Everyone who supports Israel is a Zionist". After his comments in Al-Ahram raised controversy, he said in a letter to The Independent and the Daily Telegraph, that his views were "distorted", writing, "I have been, and am, a lifelong opponent of anti-Semitism ... I do not support attacks on Israeli civilians under any circumstances. I am in favour of the current efforts to achieve a two-state solution to the conflict between Israel and the Palestinians". In 2009, he translated Euripides's Medea. The band Tompaulin were named after Paulin.

References

External links
 Tom Paulin: Poetic polemicist BBC News, 15 November 2002 – Profile
 British Council profile
 Archival Material at 
Stuart A. Rose Manuscript, Archives, and Rare Book Library, Emory University: Tom Paulin papers, 1969-2008

1949 births
Living people
Academics of the University of Nottingham
Alumni of the University of Hull
Alumni of Lincoln College, Oxford
Irish people of Scottish descent
Male poets from Northern Ireland
Male writers from Northern Ireland
21st-century writers from Northern Ireland
People educated at Annadale Grammar School
Writers from Belfast